The UK Albums Chart is a record chart based on weekly album sales; during the 1950s, a total of 17 different albums reached number one. The longest run at number one was the original soundtrack of the movie South Pacific, which held on to the top spot for 60 consecutive weeks in the 1950s, and went on to attain another 55 weeks in 1960 and 1961, totalling a record of 115 weeks at number-one in the UK. It was number-one for the entire year in 1959.

The UK Albums Chart canon was modified when chart fans Alan Smith and Keith Badman discovered that charts of albums in the UK dated back to 28 July 1956, not 8 November 1958 as previously thought. The first album chart was a Top 5 published in Record Mirror. The album at number one on this chart was Songs for Swingin' Lovers! by Frank Sinatra. From 8 November 1958, a Top 10 album chart was compiled by Melody Maker. Although the Record Mirror chart continued to run after this date, Melody Maker is taken as the canonical source as it had a larger sample. In 1959, from June to August a newspaper strike prevented the album chart from being published and the previous chart was duplicated in these weeks. Nevertheless, the South Pacific soundtrack was number one for the entire duration of 1959.

Number ones

By artist

Five artists topped the album chart during the 1950s. Original soundtracks and cast recordings are omitted.

Christmas number ones

In the UK, Christmas number-one albums are those that are at the top of the UK Albums Chart on Christmas Day. Typically, this will refer to the album that was announced as number one on the Sunday before 25 December—when Christmas Day falls on a Sunday itself, the official number one is considered by the OCC to be the one announced on that day's chart. During the 1950s, the following albums were Christmas number ones.

Comparison to Record Mirror album chart
From 8 November 1958, Melody Maker is regarded as the canonical source. Record Mirror continued to compile an album chart with the following differences:

Notes

References
Footnotes

Sources

External links
Archive of all UK Number One Albums of the 1950s with images of original packaging
Official UK Albums Top 100 at the Official Charts Company
The Official UK Top 40 Albums Chart at BBC Radio 1

UK Albums
1950s